The men's 20 kilometres race walk at the 2016 Summer Olympics in Rio de Janeiro took place on 12 August on a route along Pontal. Wang Zhen was the first male athletics medallist of the games. His Chinese teammate Cai Zelin was second and Dane Bird-Smith of Australia took the bronze.

Summary
Miguel Ángel López of Spain, the reigning 2015 World Champion, was among the favourites though he was not high on the world lists that year. The defending 2012 Olympic champion Chen Ding had been defeated in national competition by Wang Zhen, who was fifth on the seasonal rankings and had won the 2016 IAAF World Race Walking Team Championships. Cai Zelin (fourth at the 2012 Olympics) rounded out the strong Chinese team. Japan entered a fast team, headed by the world's top three ranked walkers: Eiki Takahashi, Isamu Fujisawa and Daisuke Matsunaga. The ban of the perennially strong Russian team affected the quality of entrants.

In the race, Tom Bosworth of Great Britain was a leader for much of the race until Wang Zhen increased the pace and disrupted the lead pack. Neither the Olympic nor World Champion could follow and López ultimately fell to tenth overall. Wang's lead was never assailed and his compatriot Cai ended the race as silver medallist some 12 seconds behind. Australia's Dane Bird-Smith outwalked home athlete Caio Bonfim to take the bronze medal, though Bonfim was rewarded with fourth and a Brazilian record.  While Bosworth faded to sixth, he still left with the British national record.

Schedule

All times are Brasília Time (UTC−3).

Records
, the existing World and Olympic records stood as follows.

Result

References

Men's 20 kilometres walk
Racewalking at the Olympics
Men's events at the 2016 Summer Olympics